AlleleID designs oligos for strain differentiation and taxa specific assays. This aids in bacterial identification, pathogen detection and species identification. The software is designed to run on Windows and Macintosh operating system. 

AlleleID aligns sequences to locate differences in DNA and to find conserved regions and then designs oligos to amplify and detect only the species or strains of interest from the mix. The platforms for which AlleleID includes support are:

 Quantitative PCR: Designs species specific and taxa specific qPCR assays
 Microarrays: Designs  species specific and taxa specific microarrays
 xMAP: Designs oligos for Direct Hybridization Assays (DHA) and ASPE assays
 MLPA: Designs probes for copy number detection and SNP studies

References

External links
AlleleID Homepage
PREMIER Biosoft Home Page
xMAP Technology
Introduction to Bacterial Identification

Bioinformatics software